Atkinson Film-Arts was an animation studio based in Ottawa, Ontario, Canada. The company is best known for producing the first two Care Bears television specials – The Care Bears in the Land Without Feelings and The Care Bears Battle the Freeze Machine – and the four syndicated specials that inspired The Raccoons (as well as first-season episodes of the show itself). Atkinson also produced the Christmas specials The Little Brown Burro, Tukiki and His Search for a Merry Christmas and The Trolls and the Christmas Express and the 1986–87 series The Adventures of Teddy Ruxpin (with DIC Entertainment).

They also worked on the 1981 science fiction anthology movie Heavy Metal and The Body Electric, an animated movie featuring music composed by the Canadian rock band Rush.

The company acquired one of Canada's oldest film studios, Crawley Films (and its Graphic Films subsidiary), in 1982 for the price of just C$1.

In 1987, the company was renamed Crawleys Animation. It produced the special The Nightingale (with Shanghai Animation Film Studio) and 13 episodes of Dennis the Menace along with 11 episodes of COPS for DIC, and worked with French studio Belokapi on a series Y's the Magnificent (which was cancelled during production and never broadcast), before shutting down in 1989 because of debt problems.

Filmography

Television specials

Television series

Direct-to-video films

Feature films

Short films

See also
Nelvana
Cookie Jar Group
CinéGroupe

References

External links

Canadian animation studios
Companies based in Ottawa
Defunct film and television production companies of Canada
Mass media companies established in 1974
Companies disestablished in 1989